Grand Prix motorcycle racing sponsorship liveries have been used since the late 1960s, replacing the previously used national colours. With sponsors becoming more important with the rising costs in the motorcycle CC classes, many teams wanted to be able to display the logos of their sponsors as clearly as possible.

The liveries are usually changed for every season in the sport, marking the marketing ideas of the sponsors. Some teams keep some consistency over the years however, like the red colour of Ducati, which has its origin in a shade of red known as rosso corsa being the national racing colour of Italy. Tobacco and alcohol advertising was common in motorsport, however as bans spread throughout the world, teams used an alternate livery which alluded to the tobacco or alcohol sponsor, or entirely eliminated their name when in nations with a ban – this is now only seen on Ducati's Marlboro sponsored vehicles – where the sponsor is technically banned from advertising in all host nations. At historical events, bikes are allowed to use the livery which was used when the bike was actively competing.

SKY VR46 MotoGP
The SKY Racing Team VR46 is a motorcycle racing team owned by Valentino Rossi and based in Tavullia (Marche, Italy). The team enters Grand Prix motorcycle racing in the Moto2 category with Kalex chassis and previously in Moto3 category with KTM RC250GP motorcycles. The team manager is the former road racer Pablo Nieto. The team has collected 24 wins (9 in Moto3 and 15 in Moto2) and one riders' championship (with Bagnaia in 2018). Expanded to MotoGP in 2021 with Esponsorama Racing

Ángel Nieto Team
Ángel Nieto Team (formerly Aspar Racing Team) is a Grand Prix motorcycle racing team from Spain, currently competing in the MotoGP and Moto3 World Championships.

In the 2010 season the Aspar team entered the MotoGP class with Héctor Barberá, who finished in twelfth place aboard a Ducati Desmosedici GP10. Simón finished in second place in the inaugural Moto2 campaign, with teammate Mike Di Meglio finishing in twentieth place. Both riders started the season on Honda-powered RSV Motors frames, switching to a Suter chassis after two races. Nicolás Terol finished in second place in the 125cc class while his teammate Bradley Smith finished fourth, both riding Aprilia RSA 125 motorcycles.

Barberá remained with the team for 2011, recording a best result of 6th at the Spanish Grand Prix. The team expanded to two bikes in 2012, switching from Ducati to ART. Aleix Espargaró and Randy de Puniet dominated the recently created CRT (Claiming Rule Teams) class for two straight years. In 2014, Aspar entered two Honda bikes, after hiring former World Champion Nicky Hayden to partner Hiroshi Aoyama. The duo scored points regularly, but Espargaró claimed a 3rd straight title in the CRT class with Forward Racing. Irishman Eugene Laverty joined the team in 2015, the last year for Hayden in the World Championship before switching to the Superbike World Championship.

Before the 2018 season began, the team changed their name from Aspar Racing Team to Ángel Nieto Team, as a tribute by former team principal Jorge Fernandez to his former compatriot Ángel Nieto. The team also announced Ángel's son Gelete as the new team principal.

MotoGP

Aprilia
Despite being a relatively small company by global motorcycling standards, Aprilia is very active in motorcycle sports. It contested many Road Racing formulae, including the now-defunct 125, 250 and 500cc Grand Prix classes of the FIM World Championship. From 2002 to 2004 they participated in the FIM MotoGP World Championship, and from 1999 to 2002 they participated in the FIM Superbike World Championship. Aprilia has returned to World Superbike since the 2009 season and in MotoGP since the 2012 season.

Aprilia made their international racing debut in the Motocross World Championship competing in the 125cc class from 1976 until 1981 with a best result being a fifth place in the 1979 season with rider Corrado Maddi. The firm then focused on the Grand Prix road racing world championships in 1985 and since then it has seen varying successes. Aprilia won their first world championship race at the 1991 Czechoslovak motorcycle Grand Prix with rider Alessandro Gramigni winning the 125cc race. In 1992 they won their first road racing world championship with Gramigni winning the 125cc class. They continued to be successful in the smaller displacement categories, winning numerous races and championships in the 125 and 250cc Grand Prix classes.

However, their 500 cc Grand Prix bikes failed to attain the same success. They began campaigning in the 500cc class in 1994 with a 250 V twin motor enlarged to 380cc in hopes of using its lighter weight and nimble handling as an advantage against the heavier, V4 engine bikes used by the competition. The bike eventually displaced 430cc and had its best result with a third place by rider Doriano Romboni at the 1997 Dutch TT but, could never overcome power disadvantage during the starting line sprint and was withdrawn at the end of the 1997 season for further development. Their first MotoGP effort, dubbed the Aprilia RS Cube, was technically advanced but difficult to ride and performed poorly in the championship. The Cube did, however, pioneer many advanced technologies including ride by wire throttle and pneumatic valve actuation systems. Aprilia left the MotoGP class at the end of 2004 and then left the lower classes when two-stroke engines were banned. Aprilia set the record for the most points earned by a manufacturer in a single season from the 125cc class with 410 points in 2007. It was also the highest points earned by a constructor in Grand Prix motorcycle racing's history until 2011 when 420 points were won by the same bikes winning 16 out of 17 races.

Aprilia rejoined the MotoGP class in 2012, taking advantage of the newly introduced Claiming Rule Team category that encouraged independent teams with lower budgets to use bikes from manufacturers not officially involved in MotoGP. Aprilia supplied RSV4 SBK-derived bikes under the ART (Aprilia Racing Technology) name to Aspar, Paul Bird Motorsport and Speed Master teams. In both the 2012 and 2013 seasons Aprilia's ART machinery stood out as the best CRT bikes.

For 2015 Aprilia returned to the world championship with a factory effort.

500cc/MotoGP

Avintia Racing
Avintia Racing is a motorcycle racing team currently competing in the MotoGP World Championship.

In 2012 the team changed its name to Avintia Racing, following an alliance between BQR and the Grupo Avintia. The team debuted in the MotoGP class as a Claiming Rule Team using both FTR Moto and Inmotec frames badged as BQR, powered by Kawasaki engines. The riders were Iván Silva and Yonny Hernández. In 2013 Avintia entered the MotoGP class with Kawasaki-engined FTR frames, fielding two bikes for Hiroshi Aoyama and Héctor Barberá.

For the 2014 season Aoyama was replaced by Mike Di Meglio and the team fielded a new bike badged as the Avintia GP14, reportedly based on the 2007-2009 Kawasaki Ninja ZX-RR with some input from Kawasaki. Following a mid-season agreement between Avintia and Ducati, Barberá received an Open-specification Ducati Desmosedici for the last five rounds.

In 2015 the team entered two Open class Desmosedici GP14 motorcycles, for Barberá and Di Meglio. For 2016 Di Meglio was replaced by Loris Baz. In 2017 the team changed its name to Reale Esponsorama Racing.

MotoGP

Cagiva
At the end of the 1970s, Cagiva began campaigning the Grand Prix motorcycle racing circuit. Randy Mamola was its lead rider from 1988 to 1990, and he achieved Cagiva’s first podium result. The company would also have some technical assistance from Yamaha. In 1991 it signed former world champion Eddie Lawson to its team. Lawson would claim the company's first victory when he won the 1992 Hungarian Grand Prix. John Kocinski would also win a Grand Prix on a Cagiva GP500 (C594), finishing third in the 1994 world championship. While Kocinski had the best results to date on the Cagiva in 1994, the company withdrew at the end of the season. The bike made one appearance in 1995 at the Italian Grand Prix, where Pierfrancesco Chili finished 10th.

Overall, the Cagiva team had achieved 3 victories, 11 podiums, 6 pole position and 3 fastest laps in the 500cc.

500cc

Ducati
When the MotoGP technical rules changed in the 2002 season, giving priority to four-stroke machinery, Ducati decided to enter Grand Prix motorcycle racing.

Ducati's first MotoGP motorcycle was unveiled at the 2002 Italian GP at Mugello, for use in the 2003 MotoGP championship. Ducati began taking part in the MotoGP Championship in the 2003 season and won one title in the 2007 season. Ducati has collected 40 wins: 23 by Casey Stoner, 8 by Andrea Dovizioso 7 by Loris Capirossi and 1 each by Troy Bayliss and Andrea Iannone.

MotoGP

Honda Racing Corporation
Honda Racing Corporation (HRC) is a division of the Honda Motor Company formed in 1982. The company combines participation in motorcycle races throughout the world with the development of high potential racing machines. Its racing activities are an important source for the creation of leading edge technologies used in the development of Honda motorcycles. HRC also contributes to the advancement of motorcycle sports through a range of activities that include sales of production racing motorcycles, support for satellite teams, and rider education programs.

In 1979, Honda returned to Grand Prix motorcycle racing with the monocoque-framed, four-stroke NR500. The FIM rules limited engines to four cylinders, so the NR500 had non-circular, 'race-track', cylinders, each with 8 valves and two connecting rods, in order to provide sufficient valve area to compete with the dominant two-stroke racers. Unfortunately, it seemed Honda tried to accomplish too much at one time and the experiment failed. For the 1982 season, Honda debuted their first two-stroke race bike, the NS500 and in 1983, Honda won their first 500 cc Grand Prix World Championship with Freddie Spencer. Since then, Honda has become a dominant marque in motorcycle Grand Prix racing, winning a plethora of top level titles with riders such as Mick Doohan and Valentino Rossi.

500cc/MotoGP

Kawasaki Motors Racing
Kawasaki returned after an absence of 20 years at the 2002 Pacific motorcycle Grand Prix. Kawasaki, with their four-stroke Ninja ZX-RR, raced as wildcards in the last four races of the season as a preparation before entering the championship full-time in the following season.

In 2004, Shinya Nakano joined the team and managed to get the ZX-RR's first podium with a third place at the Japanese Grand Prix. In 2005, Olivier Jacque scored a second place at the Chinese Grand Prix. The next year Nakano finished second at the Dutch TT. In 2007, Randy de Puniet scored a second place at the Japanese Grand Prix. In 2008 John Hopkins and Anthony West rode the machine.

The ZX-RR struggled in 2008, with the best results being two fifth-place finishes from John Hopkins in Portugal and Anthony West in Brno. Hopkins and West blamed both a lack of feeling in the front end and rear traction on corner exit. Previous ZX-RRs have been difficult to ride, but beyond the limited statements by the riders it is unclear what the problems with the 2008 bike were.

In August 2008, Kawasaki signed Marco Melandri to join John Hopkins for the 2009 season. However, the global financial crisis of 2008 caused Kawasaki to reconsider its MotoGP program, and the Italian sports daily Tuttosport reported on December 30 that Kawasaki would be pulling out of MotoGP for 2009.

On January 9, 2009, Kawasaki announced it had decided to "... suspend its MotoGP racing activities from 2009 season onward and reallocate management resources more efficiently". The company stated that it will continue racing activities using mass-produced motorcycles as well as supporting general race oriented consumers.

MotoGP

KTM
KTM AG (the former KTM Sportmotorcycle AG) is an Austrian motorcycle and sports car manufacturer owned by KTM Industries AG and Indian manufacturer Bajaj Auto. It was formed in 1992 but traces its foundation to as early as 1934. Today, KTM AG is the parent company of the KTM Group.

In 2003, KTM started sponsoring and supporting Road racing in various capacities, with the most successful results stemming from their Supermoto efforts. From 2003 to 2009, a KTM factory team competed in the 125cc class of the motorcycle Grand Prix, and between 2005 and 2008 in the 250cc class. Notable successes in the 125 cc class were the second and third place in the overall ranking scored in 2005 by KTM riders Mika Kallio and Gábor Talmácsi, the second place in 2006 by Mika Kallio, the third place in 2007 by Tomoyoshi Koyama and the 2005 KTM victory in the 125 cc constructor championship. In the 250 cc class, Mika Kallio won third place in 2008. Since the first Rookies Cup season in 2007, KTM has supplied the bike for the Red Bull MotoGP Rookies Cup. In 2009, KTM announced their withdrawal from Grand Prix motorcycle racing in all classes, and did not return until 2012 in the new Moto3 class.

In 2012, KTM won the Moto3 manufacturers' championship. During the next season, KTM riders prevailed in every race of the Moto3 class and won the world title as well as second and third place, making KTM the obvious victor of the manufacturers' standing. KTM won the manufacturer title in the 2014 and 2016 as well as the world title in 2016 in the Moto3 class. Starting in 2017, KTM fields bikes in both MotoGP and Moto2 classes as well. The main class team features Bradley Smith and Pol Espargaró as full-season riders, and Mika Kallio as wildcard rider. The Moto2 KTM Ajo team features Miguel Oliveira and Brad Binder.

MotoGP

Marc VDS Racing Team
Marc VDS Racing Team is a Belgian motorcycle racing team founded by Marc van der Straten, although it is composed of several smaller teams all operating under the Marc VDS banner. The team currently competes in two disciplines of motorsport: motorcycle racing in the MotoGP World Championship and the Moto2 World Championship, and rallying in various rally raid events. It has also formerly competed in many auto racing championships, such as the Blancpain Endurance Series and the European Le Mans Series.

MotoGP

Pramac Racing
Pramac Racing is a motorcycle racing team currently competing in the MotoGP World Championship. The team was created in 2002 by Italian company Pramac. In 2005 Pramac Racing joined forces with d'Antin MotoGP to form Pramac d'Antin and in 2007 the team became part of the Pramac Group. After d'Antin left the team in 2008, the team became known as Pramac Racing.

MotoGP

Suzuki MotoGP
Suzuki MotoGP is the official factory-backed team of Suzuki in the MotoGP World Championship. Suzuki first entered a works team in the 500cc Grand Prix World Championship in 1974 with riders Barry Sheene and Findlay riding the Suzuki RG500. A second-place finish by Sheene in the opening round was the best result of the season. The team's first victory came in 1975, a pole-to-finish win by Barry Sheene at the Dutch TT. Sheene finished the season 6th overall with two wins.

Barry Sheene won the riders' championship in 1976 with a total of five wins. Sheene's second 500cc riders' championship came in 1977 with six wins. Teammate Steve Parrish was fifth.

Marco Lucchinelli became the 500cc World Champion in 1981, riding the new Suzuki RG 500 gamma for the Roberto Gallina racing team. Lucchinelli left Suzuki to join Honda in 1982. He was replaced on the Gallina team by Franco Uncini who went on to win the World Championship with five wins. Uncini was severely injured at the Dutch TT at Assen in 1983 and was unable to defend his title. Suzuki withdrew factory support at the end of the season.

After three years away Suzuki returned in 1987 with factory supported entries. While not a full-time return, riders Takumi Itoh and Kevin Schwantz had some good results aboard the new Suzuki RGV500. Suzuki made a full return to racing in 1988 with Schwantz finishing 8th overall with two wins whilst teammate Rob McElnea finished the season in 10th place. With a total of six wins, Schwantz was ranked fourth for the 1989 season.

Schwantz won his long-awaited first World Championship in 1993 with four race wins. His new teammate Alex Barros also scored a win and finished 6th overall.

Kenny Roberts Jr. became World Champion in 2000 with a total of four victories, while Nobuatsu Aoki was 10th overall.

For the 2011 season, the team fielded only one GSV-R for Álvaro Bautista with no replacement for Loris Capirossi, who moved to the Pramac Racing team. At the end of 2011 Suzuki pulled out of MotoGP citing the need to reduce costs amid the global economic downturn.

On 30 September 2014 Suzuki Motor Corporation announced that it would participate in MotoGP from 2015, with Aleix Espargaró and Maverick Viñales as their two riders. They raced a newly developed MotoGP machine, the GSX-RR, with a restructured team organisation led by Davide Brivio.

500cc/MotoGP

Team LCR
Team LCR is a motorcycle racing team currently competing in the MotoGP World Championship under the name LCR Honda. The team was founded in 1996 by Italian rider Lucio Cecchinello. In 2015, they were represented by British rider Cal Crutchlow on a factory-specification Honda RC213V bike, and Australian rookie Jack Miller, riding an open-specification Honda RC213V-RS. However, the team downgraded to a single bike for Crutchlow in 2016, as Miller moved to the Estrella Galicia 0,0 Marc VDS Team.

MotoGP

Tech 3
Tech 3 is a motorcycle racing team currently competing in the MotoGP World Championship under the name Monster Yamaha Tech 3 and in the Moto2 World Championship under the name Tech 3 Moto2.

Tech 3 functions as a junior team to the Movistar Yamaha MotoGP Team, with the aim of developing the skills of promising riders for the senior team. The team was founded by ex-racer Hervé Poncharal, engineer Guy Coulon and Bernard Martignac and started racing in 1990 in the 250 cc class, using Honda and Suzuki motorcycles. In 1999, the team partnered with Yamaha for the factory team and in 2000 their riders, Olivier Jacque and Shinya Nakano, placed first and second in the 250 world championship. In 2001 the team moved the whole operation to the premier class, again with Yamaha, Jacque and Nakano on the YZR500,"MotoGP – Tech 3 Yamaha". though their status changed to that of satellite team through to the present.

Towards the end of the 2002 season, the team was given use of the YZR-M1. In 2006 and 2007 the team used Dunlop tyres, but returned to Michelin in 2008. In the 2008 Grand Prix motorcycle racing season, the two-time and reigning Superbike World Champion James Toseland partnered with the two-time Superbike World Champion Colin Edwards. For 2010, Ben Spies replaced Toseland. Spies finished the season in sixth place while Edwards finished in eleventh place. In the new Moto2 category, Tech 3 rider Yuki Takahashi finished the season in twelfth place while Raffaele De Rosa finished 27th, aboard Honda-powered bikes using a Tech 3 chassis.

For 2011, Spies moved to the factory Yamaha team, and was being replaced by Cal Crutchlow; the team again retained Colin Edwards for a fourth season. For 2012, Crutchlow moves into the second year of his two-year deal, while Edwards announced that he was leaving for the Forward Racing team with Andrea Dovizioso having been confirmed as his replacement. Bradley Smith signed a deal to ride for the team in MotoGP in 2013 and 2014.

500cc/MotoGP

Yamaha Motor Racing
Yamaha Motor Racing or Yamaha Factory Racing is the official Italian-Japanese factory team of Yamaha in MotoGP.

In motorcycle racing Yamaha has won 39 world championships, including 6 in MotoGP and 9 in the preceding 500 cc two-stroke class, and 1 in World Superbike. In addition Yamaha have recorded 208 victories at the Isle of Man TT and head the list of victories at the Sidecar TT with 40. Past Yamaha riders include: Giacomo Agostini, Bob Hannah, Heikki Mikkola, Kenny Roberts, Eddie Lawson, Wayne Rainey, Jeremy McGrath, Stefan Merriman, Dave Molyneux, Ian Hutchinson, Phil Read, Chad Reed, Ben Spies and Jorge Lorenzo. Their current lineup consists of 9 time champion Valentino Rossi and Maverick Viñales.

500cc/MotoGP

References

Grand Prix motorcycle racing
Motorcycle road racing series
Fédération Internationale de Motocyclisme
Liveries